The Woman in the Hall is a 1939 novel by the British writer Gladys Bronwyn Stern. The lifestyle of a confidence trickster mother has a psychologically disturbing effect on her daughter who she uses as an essential part in her various swindles.

Film adaptation
In 1947 it was adapted into a British film of the same title directed by Jack Lee and starring Ursula Jeans, Jean Simmons and Cecil Parker.

References

Bibliography
 Goble, Alan. The Complete Index to Literary Sources in Film. Walter de Gruyter, 1999.
 Watson, George & Willison, Ian R. The New Cambridge Bibliography of English Literature, Volume 4. CUP, 1972.

1939 British novels
Novels set in England
British mystery novels
Novels by Gladys Bronwyn Stern
British novels adapted into films
Macmillan Publishers books
Cassell (publisher) books